The Engstligenalp is a plateau of the western Swiss Alps. Since 1996 it has belonged to the Swiss culture landscapes of national importance.

The  plateau, which belongs to the community of Adelboden, has the form of an oval measuring in a north-south direction  an in an east-west direction  and is surrounded by mountains, dominated by the Wildstrubel in the southwest. It is covered by alpine pastures and crossed by numerous mountain streams springing from the slopes. At the exit of the valley, the streams join to form the Engstligen Falls which cascade in one of the most impressive waterfalls of the western Swiss alps  down to the Engstligen Valley. 
Since the 1920s, there has also been a cable car. A hiking trail leads south over three mountain passes (Chindbettipass, Rote Chumme, Gemmi) to Leukerbad in the Valais, another leads west to the Lenk valley.

Since the Middle Ages, the Engstligenalp has been used as alpine pasture. Today it is owned by an alp cooperative of about 100 farmers from Frutigen and Adelboden. It offers from end of June to mid September pasture for 500 cattle (about one third cows, and one third calves) of the big brown-white Simmental race. A spectacular event is the alpine procession in June, when 350 cattle move up the steepest cow track in Switzerland through the rock wall.
From the milk of the cows the Alpine dairymen using old handicraft techniques produce a Bernese Alp cheese which is so searched for that it is sold in private and not available in open market. (Ernst Roth, z'Bärg im Frutigland, volume three of Wege zum Alpkäse)

In the 20th century, the Engstligenalp opened up to moderate tourism with two guest houses. In summer it offers hikes and climbing routes and, as a specialty, a wheelchair route of 5 km including the necessary infrastructure in the two guest houses, offering to handicapped people the chance to enjoy an unspoilt alpine landscape.

In winter there are two cross-country skiing routes and winter hiking routes usable from December to April on the plateau and a winter hiking path also usable for Nordic alpin hiking  as well as several skilifts at the northern slope offering easy and difficult downhill passages and a special area for off-piste snowboarding.

References

External links
engstligenalp.ch 
Adelboden tourism 
Engstligenalp, official data on alp economy 
Documentary: Alpine procession to Engstligenalp 

Bernese Oberland
Plateaus of Europe
Adelboden